Edward W. Wallace (1950 – 22 December 2021) was an Irish footballer and manager who played for several clubs in the League of Ireland before later becoming involved in team management and development.

Career

Wallace enjoyed a brief playing career as a goalkeeper and played for Shelbourne, Galway and Drogheda United in the League of Ireland before reverting to the intermediate game with the St Francis club. He worked closely as a coach with Pat Devlin when Bray Wanderers entered the League of Ireland in 1985. He also worked with Pete Mahon at UCD and had spells assisting Bohemians, St Francis and St Patrick’s Athletic in various positions. Wallace had a brief spell as manager at Athlone Town.

Death

Wallace died after a period of illness on 22 December 2021, aged 71.

References

1950 births
2021 deaths
League of Ireland players
Shelbourne F.C. players
Galway United F.C. players
Drogheda United F.C. players
Association footballers from Dublin (city)
League of Ireland managers
Republic of Ireland association footballers
Association football goalkeepers
Athlone Town A.F.C. managers